The spider and the fly problem is a recreational geodesics problem with an unintuitive solution.

Problem
In the typical version of the puzzle, an otherwise empty cuboid room 30 feet long, 12 feet wide and 12 feet high contains a spider and a fly. The spider is 1 foot below the ceiling and horizontally centred on one 12′×12′ wall. The fly is 1 foot above the floor and horizontally centred on the opposite wall. The problem is to find the minimum distance the spider must crawl along the walls, ceiling and/or floor to reach the fly, which remains stationary.

Solutions
A naive solution is for the spider to remain horizontally centred, and crawl up to the ceiling, across it and down to the fly, giving a distance of 42 feet. The shortest distance strictly abiding by the rules, 40 feet, is obtained by constructing an appropriate net of the room and connecting the spider and fly with a straight line, but counter-intuitively this optimal path used five of the six faces of the cuboid and can easily be missed. 

A lateral thinking solution involves the spider attaching dragline silk to the wall to lower itself to the floor, and crawling 30 feet across it and 1 foot up the opposite wall, giving a crawl distance of 31 feet. Similarly, it can climb to the ceiling, cross it, then attach the silk to lower itself 11 feet, also a 31-foot crawl.

History
The problem was originally posed by Henry Dudeney in the English newspaper Weekly Dispatch on 14 June 1903, presented in The Canterbury Puzzles (1907) and described by Martin Gardner.

References

Recreational mathematics